The albums discography of Japanese recording artist Akina Nakamori consists of 25 studio albums, 11 compilation albums, 11 cover albums, two live albums, one box set, and six extended plays.

To date, Nakamori has sold more than 25.7 million records nationwide. She has 22 No. 1 singles and 18 No. 1 albums, being the nineteenth best-selling artist in Japan of all-time.

Studio albums

Reissue albums

Compilation albums

Official

Unofficial
These compilations were released by the record labels without direct input from Nakamori.

Cover albums

Live albums

Box sets

Official

Unofficial
These box sets were released by the record labels without direct input from Nakamori.

Extended plays

See also

 Akina Nakamori
 List of best-selling music artists in Japan

Notes

References

External links
 

Discographies of Japanese artists
Pop music discographies